The Slovenian Rhythmic Gymnastics National Championship is an annual rhythmic gymnastics national competition in Slovenia.

Slovenian Championships Medalists

Apparatus Finals

Medal table

External links
 Official Website
 Rhythmic Gymnastics Results
 http://www.klubrg-narodnidom.si/

 Fédération Internationale de Gymnastique

 

Slovenian
Gymnastics in Slovenia
National championships in Slovenia